Atheist is an American death metal band from Florida, founded in 1984 by the vocalist and rhythm guitarist Kelly Shaefer, lead guitarist Rand Burkey, bassist Roger Patterson and drummer Steve Flynn. The band is known for its highly technical playing style, and its 1991 album Unquestionable Presence is regarded as a landmark of the technical death metal genre. After disbanding in 1994, the group reformed in 2006 and has since released one studio album and a live DVD.

History 

The band was originally formed in 1984 in Sarasota, Florida, firstly under the name Oblivion and later as R.A.V.A.G.E. (which stands for "Raging Atheists Vowing A Gory End"). They recorded their first album, Piece of Time, in 1988, though the album was not released until 1990 due to record company issues. In 1991, Patterson died in a car accident and Atheist recruited Tony Choy (previously a member of Cynic) to record their second album, Unquestionable Presence. Atheist disbanded for the first time in 1992, reuniting in 1993 and recording a third album, Elements, fulfilling their contractual requirements, before disbanding for a second time.

Seven years after their second break up, Shaefer decided to re-release and remaster their three albums with different bonus tracks.

Relapse Records re-issued the band's three albums in late 2005, as well as a vinyl box set containing the three albums plus the R.A.V.A.G.E. demo "On They Slay". Flynn formed the band Gnostic in the same year. In January 2006, Atheist announced they were regrouping to perform live during the summer and autumn. The line-up was Shaefer, Burkey, Choy and Flynn. Shaefer only provided vocals due to long battles with tendinitis and carpal tunnel syndrome. The Gnostic guitarist Sonny Carson played all of Shaefer's guitar parts, while Burkey was later replaced by Chris Baker of Gnostic.

On July 12, 2008, Shaefer issued a statement indicating that he and Flynn were working on new material. A month later, Shaefer announced that they had commenced the recording of a new studio album, which would be their first in over 15 years. The band toured Europe and the US in 2009 to celebrate the 20th anniversary of the release of Piece of Time. A live DVD filmed at the Wacken Open Air Festival appeared towards the end of the year.

On July 11, 2010, Atheist revealed that their fourth studio album would be called Jupiter and was set for a November release. They inked a deal with Season of Mist and Jupiter was released on November 8, 2010.

On August 3, 2010, Shaefer and Flynn announced on behalf of the band that Tony Choy would not be appearing on Jupiter but was still likely to appear in live performances with the band due to his own musical aspirations. The band announced in 2014 that it was working on a fifth studio album, which was planned to be released in 2015; however, the album would be left unreleased for over half a decade.

In February 2018, Atheist signed with Agonia Records, and the band expects to release their fifth studio album sometime in 2023.

Members 
Current
 Kelly Shaefer – vocals , rhythm guitar 
 Steve Flynn – drums 
 Chris Martin – rhythm guitar 

Current live musicians
 Anthony Medaglia – drums 

Former

Guitarists
 Rand Burkey – 
 Frank Emmi – 
 Sonny Carson – 
 Chris Baker – 
 Jonathan Thompson – , bass 
 Jason Holloway – 

Bassists
 Roger Patterson – 
 Tony Choy – 
 Darren McFarland – 
 Travis Morgan – 
 Sean Martinez – 

Drummers
 Marcel DeSantos – 
 Mickey Hayes – 
 Josh Greenbaum – 
 Joey Muha – live 

Timeline

Discography

Studio albums 
 Piece of Time (1990)
 Unquestionable Presence (1991)
 Elements (1993)
 Jupiter (2010)

Live albums 
 Unquestionable Presence: Live at Wacken (2009)

References

External links 
 
 Official Facebook page

1984 establishments in Florida
American technical death metal musical groups
American progressive metal musical groups
Death metal musical groups from Florida
Musical groups established in 1984
Musical groups disestablished in 1992
Musical groups reestablished in 1993
Musical groups disestablished in 1994
Musical groups reestablished in 2006
Musical quintets
Relapse Records artists
Season of Mist artists